is a Japanese enka singer and an actor.

Discography
 : Co-starring with Sayuri Yoshinaga (1962)

Itako Gasa

Filmography

Film
His filmography includes 36 films:
Itakogasa (1961)
Okese utaeba (1961)
Tsukiyo no wataridori (1963)
Itsudemo yume o (1963)
Koi to namida no taiyô (1966)
Yoake no futari (1968)

Television
 Mito Komon (????)
 No Side Manager (2019)

References

External links
Official Website

Enka singers
Japanese male singers
Japanese male actors
1943 births
People from Arakawa, Tokyo
Living people
Singers from Tokyo